Walter Dieckmann (8 October 1869 – 12 January 1925) was a German chemist. He is the namesake of the Dieckmann condensation, the intramolecular reaction of diesters with base to give β-keto esters.

Dieckmann studied at the University of Munich and became assistant of  Adolf von Baeyer.

1869 births
1925 deaths
20th-century German chemists
Academic staff of the Ludwig Maximilian University of Munich
BASF people
19th-century German chemists